Angiopteris evecta, commonly known as the king fern, giant fern, elephant fern, oriental vessel fern, Madagascar tree fern, or mule's Foot fern, is a very large rainforest fern in the family Marattiaceae native to most parts of Southeast Asia and Oceania. It has a history dating back about 300 million years, and is believed to have the longest fronds of any fern in the world.

Description
Angiopteris evecta is a self-supporting evergreen perennial fern with very large bipinnate fronds.

They are said to be the longest fern fronds in the world, and despite their enormous size they have no woody strengthening tissues in the fronds to keep them erect—instead they are supported entirely by the hydraulic pressure of the sap.

Sporangia are borne on the underside of the pinnules, very close to the margin, in clusters of 5 to 8 opposite pairs.

Evolution
Fossilised fronds bearing a distinct similarity to this plant have been found in Paleozoic rocks from every continent, indicating that the species is very primitive and was widespread around 300 million years ago, a time when ferns and their relatives were the dominant plants on the planet. The geographically isolated communities seen today point to favourable climatic conditions being more widespread in the past.

Taxonomy

Angiopteris evecta was originally named and described as Polypodium evectum by Georg Forster in 1786, in his work Florulae Insularum Australium Prodromus. It was moved to the genus Angiopteris in 1794 by Georg Franz Hoffmann, publishing in the journal Commentationes Societatis Regiae Scientiarum Gottingensis. A. evecta is the type species of the genus Angiopteris.

Etymology
The genus name comes from the Ancient Greek aggeion, a vessel, and pteris, a fern, and is a reference to the sporangia. The species epithet is the Latin adjective evectus meaning  to carry out, bring forth, raise, or elevate.

Synonyms
, Plants of the World Online lists 73 synonyms for Angiopteris evecta, which are considered by some authorities to potentially be distinct species, calling for a more thorough taxonomic investigation.

 Angiopteris acrocarpa de Vriese
 Angiopteris affinis de Vriese
 Angiopteris alata Nadeaud
 Angiopteris albidopunctulata Rosenst.
 Angiopteris amboinensis de Vriese
 Angiopteris angustata Miq.
 Angiopteris angustifolia C.Presl
 Angiopteris ankolana de Vriese
 Angiopteris aphanosorus de Vriese
 Angiopteris approximata de Vriese
 Angiopteris arborescens (Blanco) Merr.
 Angiopteris assamica de Vriese
 Angiopteris athroocarpa Alderw.
 Angiopteris aurata de Vriese
 Angiopteris badioneura de Vriese
 Angiopteris beecheyana de Vriese
 Angiopteris brongniartiana de Vriese
 Angiopteris canaliculata Holttum
 Angiopteris caudata de Vriese
 Angiopteris commutata C.Presl
 Angiopteris crassifolia de Vriese
 Angiopteris cumingii Hieron.
 Angiopteris cupreata de Vriese
 Angiopteris cuspidata de Vriese
 Angiopteris dregeana de Vriese
 Angiopteris durvilleana de Vriese
 Angiopteris elongata Hieron.
 Angiopteris erecta Desv.
 Angiopteris evanidostriata Hieron.
 Angiopteris evecta var. rurutensis E.D.Br.
 Angiopteris grisea Alderw.
 Angiopteris hellwigii Hieron.
 Angiopteris inconstans Alderw.
 Angiopteris indica Desv.
 Angiopteris intricata C.Presl
 Angiopteris javanica C.Presl
 Angiopteris lancifoliolata Alderw.
 Angiopteris lasegueana de Vriese
 Angiopteris lauterbachii Hieron.
 Angiopteris leytensis Alderw.
 Angiopteris longifolia Grev. & Hook.
 Angiopteris lorentzii Rosenst.
 Angiopteris medogensis Ching & Y.X.Lin
 Angiopteris mekongensis Ching ex C.Chr. & Tardieu
 Angiopteris microsporangia de Vriese
 Angiopteris microura Copel.
 Angiopteris miqueliana de Vriese
 Angiopteris monstruosa Alderw.
 Angiopteris naumannii Hieron.
 Angiopteris norrisii Rosenst.
 Angiopteris novocaledonica Hieron.
 Angiopteris oligotheca Hieron.
 Angiopteris olivacea Alderw.
 Angiopteris palauensis Hieron.
 Angiopteris pallescens de Vriese
 Angiopteris pallida Rosenst.
 Angiopteris palmiformis (Cav.) C.Chr.
 Angiopteris papandayanensis Hieron.
 Angiopteris polytheca C.Chr. & Tardieu
 Angiopteris presliana de Vriese
 Angiopteris ruttenii Alderw.
 Angiopteris similis C.Presl
 Angiopteris stellatosora C.Chr.
 Angiopteris subfurfuracea Alderw.
 Angiopteris teysmanniana de Vriese
 Angiopteris uncinata de Vriese
 Angiopteris willinkii Miquel
 Callipteris heterophylla Moore
 Clementea palmiformis Cav.
 Danaea evecta (G.Forst.) Spreng.
 Lomaria pedunculata Goldm.
 Myriotheca arborescens Blanco
 Polypodium evectum G.Forst.

Distribution and habitat
Angiopteris evecta is native to southeast Asia and Oceania, from Sri Lanka and Bangladesh in the west through to Melanesia, Micronesia and Polynesia in the east, and from Japan in the north to northern and eastern Australia in the south. It has been introduced to most of the rest of tropical Asia, as well as Madagascar and parts of the tropical Americas. It has become naturalised in Hawaii, Jamaica, Costa Rica and Cuba.

The species grows in rainforest on very rich soils, often of volcanic origin and prefers a very warm wet climate. It is usually an understorey plant in well developed rainforest, especially along creek banks in deep sheltered gullies where there is good drainage and a plentiful supply of fresh water, but is occasionally found in more exposed situations.

Cultural uses
The starchy rhizomes are eaten after long processing to remove toxins, used to perfume coconut oil,  to flavour rice and to produce an intoxicating drink. The 1889 book The Useful Native Plants of Australia records Indigenous Australians ate the pith of this fern.

Conservation
The conservation status of Angiopteris evecta varies from place to place. For example in Australia's Northern Territory it is listed as vulnerable, with only one small population in north eastern Arnhem Land; in New South Wales, where suitable habitat is restricted to a small area in the north east corner of the state and only a single, non-reproductive specimen is known, it is listed as endangered. However in the state of Queensland, which lies in between the other two states and where there is an abundance of suitable habitat, it is listed as least concern.

, this species has not been assessed by the IUCN.

Invasive potential
When introduced to an area with a suitable climate, Angiopteris evecta can establish dense stands that inhibit local species. It is listed as invasive in Costa Rica, Cuba, Jamaica and Hawaii, where in each case it has escaped from plantings in botanic gardens. It has also been introduced to many tropical countries and has repeatedly escaped from cultivation.

Gallery

References

External links
 
 
 View a map of recorded sightings of Angiopteris evecta at the Australasian Virtual Herbarium
 See images of Angiopteris evecta on Flickriver

Marattiidae
Flora of Australia
Flora of Malesia
Flora of Papuasia
Flora of the Pacific
Wet Tropics of Queensland